The Dales is a British travel documentary show that aired on ITV from 28 March 2011 to 5 August 2013 and was hosted by Ade Edmondson.

Amanda Owen ("The Yorkshire Shepherdess") and her family appeared as regulars on this series, with the family in the first series including Amanda and husband Clive, plus young children Raven, Reuben, Miles, Edith and Violet.

The Owens appeared on The Dales alongside the Reverend Ann Chapman, the vicar of four small churches in Yorkshire, mother and son farmers Philip and Carol Mellin, and Izzy Lane, known for her sustainable wool fashion business.

The programme was repeated on Together TV in 2021 and was added to the My5 streaming catalogue alongside Our Yorkshire Farm and New Lives in the Wild.

References

2010s British documentary television series
2010s British travel television series
2011 British television series debuts
2013 British television series endings
ITV (TV network) original programming
Television series by ITV Studios
Television shows set in Yorkshire